Erdemir is a Turkish steel producer.

Erdemir may also refer to:
 Erdemir SK, a basketball club based in Zonguldak, Turkey
 Port of Erdemir, a port in the western Black Sea

People with the surname
 Ali Erdemir, Turkish scientist

Turkish-language surnames